Gravesham is a local government district with borough status in north-west Kent, England. Its administrative centre and largest town is Gravesend, which was known as Gravesham in ancient times.

Gravesham was formed on 1 April 1974 by the merger of the Municipal Borough of Gravesend with Northfleet Urban District and part of Strood Rural District, under the Local Government Act 1972. It borders the Borough of Dartford and Sevenoaks District to the west, the Borough of Tonbridge and Malling to the south, the Medway unitary authority to the east and the Thurrock unitary authority of Essex to the north, via the River Thames.

Gravesham is twinned with Cambrai in Hauts-de-France, France and Neumünster in Schleswig-Holstein, Germany. The present borders of Gravesham parliamentary constituency are almost the same as those of the borough.

History

Robert Heath Hiscock LL.B., F.S.A., Chairman of the Gravesend Historical Society, in the foreword to his book, 'A History of Gravesend' (Phillimore, 1976) wrote:

"The name Gravesham appears only in the Domesday Book, 1086, and was probably the error of a Norman scribe. It was 'Gravesend' in the Domesday Monarchorum c.1100, and 'Gravesende' in the Textus Roffensis c. 1100. It is strange that this "clerical error" should now have been adopted as the name of the new Council".

Housing and architecture

Housing varies from mid rise to low rise, particularly in the villages.  The district has 12 buildings listed in the highest category of the national grading system, Grade I, three of which are private residences:

Gadshill Place in Higham 
Luddesdown Court in Luddesdown
Nurstead Court in Meopham

Cobham Hall, also in the highest architectural category, is a stately home which was formerly the seat of the Earls of Darnley: since 1965 it has been a private girls' school. Cobham Park is Grade II*-listed which is listed separately in the gardens and parklands category of classification approved by the Department of Culture, Media and Sport; and includes the remains of a Roman villa.

The other Grade I-listed buildings in the borough comprise its ancient parish churches.

Gravesham is home to the largest Sikh Gurdwara in Europe, Guru Nanak Darbar Gurdwara.

Governance

Wards
There are eighteen wards represented on the borough council: 
Those serving Gravesend town:
 Central
 Pelham
 Riverside
 Singlewell
 Whitehill
 Woodlands
 Other urban areas:
 Northfleet (2 wards - North & South)
 Coldharbour
 Istead Rise
 Painters Ash
 Riverview
 Westcourt
Outlying villages:
 Chalk
 Higham
 Meopham North
 Meopham South which includes Vigo
 Nurstead 
 Shorne, Cobham & Luddesdown

Elections

Gravesham Borough Council is elected every four years, with currently 44 Councillors being elected at each election. From the first election in 1973 the council has alternated between Labour and Conservative control. Since 1995 Labour has controlled the council apart from 4 years between the 2007 and 2011 elections. As of the 2019 election the council is composed as follows:

See also 
 List of civil parishes in Kent

References

External links
 Gravesham Borough Council YouTube channel
About Gravesend website

 
Thames Gateway
Local authorities adjoining the River Thames
Non-metropolitan districts of Kent
Boroughs in England